The 2010 Tour de France was the 97th edition of the Tour de France, one of cycling's Grand Tours. This Tour featured 22 cycling teams. Eighteen of the teams invited to the Tour were a part of the UCI ProTour, the other four teams were Professional Continental teams. The Tour will begin in Rotterdam, which is located in the Netherlands on 3 July, and finish on the Champs-Élysées in Paris on 25 July.

Twenty-two teams have been invited to participate in the 2010 Tour de France. Sixteen teams, including two which are no longer part of the UCI ProTour, are covered by a September 2008 agreement with the Union Cycliste Internationale. The sixteen teams are:

Teams

Qualified teams

 
 
  
 
  
 
 
 
 
 
 
 
 
 
 
 

Invited teams

  
  
 
 
 
 

: Teams not part of the ProTour.

Cyclists

As of 1 July 2010.

By team

By rider

By nationality

References

2010 Tour de France
2010